The Strategic Trade Advisory Group (STAG) is an executive agency that advises UK Department for International Trade on the view of stakeholders and devolved parliaments by providing evidence, relevant experience and expertise

Role, Chair & Structure 
Role

The Strategic Advisory Group works with stakeholders to help to shape the United Kingdom’s trade policy, and helps to provide opportunities across all nations and regions of the UK through internal discussion.

Chair and structure

The Strategic Trade Advisory group is chaired by the Minister of State for Trade (DIT), and has meetings quarterly.

Membership 
STAG is composed of 16 core members selected by the Government, with membership of this group reviewed annually. Neither the democratically representative devolved administrations of Scotland, Wales, Northern Ireland and London, nor the city regions in England, have any representation,  or otherwise.

Government officials are also invited to attend, and depending on the topic of discussion the appropriate minister received the invitation to attend.

References

External links 
Summary Of Discussion, June 6, 2019
Summary Of Discussion, September 10, 2019

Foreign trade of the United Kingdom
Government agencies established in 2019
Public bodies and task forces of the United Kingdom government
2019 establishments in the United Kingdom